José Carlos de Brito e Cunha, known as J. Carlos, (July 18, 1884 — October 2, 1950) was a Brazilian cartoonist, illustrator and graphic designer. J. Carlos also did sculpture, wrote vaudeville plays, wrote lyrics for samba and was a major talent in Brazilian Art Deco graphic design.

Biography

Carlos was born and died in Rio de Janeiro.  His first work, a drawing of a newcomer, was published in 1902 in the magazine Tagarela. He soon became a regular contributor to the magazine and within less than a year, designed a cover. He collaborated in design and illustration in all the major publications of Brazil from the 1900s until the late 1940s, including O Malho, O Tico Tico, Fon-Fon!, Careta, A Cigarra, Vida Moderna, Para Todos, Eu Sei Tudo, Revista da Semana, and O Cruzeiro.

His oeuvre is estimated to be more than 100,000 illustrations, with a varied range of fictionalized personages and Brazilian popular figures of the time. From a quintessential Brazilian archetype comic strip, the whimsical little black girl named Lamparina, and other curious cariocas type, to middle class characters and famed politics and society people, nobody in the Brazilian conscious mind escaped J.Carlos elegant line of perception.

In the 1930s, J. Carlos was the first Brazilian to draw Mickey Mouse; he drew the character in covers and advertisements in the magazine O Tico Tico.

In 1941, Walt Disney visited Brazil. Disney was impressed with the style of J. Carlos and asked him to work in Hollywood. The illustrator declined, but sent Disney a drawing of a parrot that inspired the creation of Joe Carioca.

In 1950, while discussing his friend's, João de Barro, known as Braguinha, upcoming record cover illustration, J. Carlos suffered a brain stroke and died two days later. In the October issue of the magazine O Careta's, J. Carlos' last contribution was much sought after.

References

Bibliography 

 Zuenir Ventura / Cássio Loredano: O Rio de J.Carlos (J.Carlos' Rio), Lacerda publisher, 1998. 
 Cássio Loredano: O Bonde e a Linha (The Streetcar and the Wire), Capivara publisher, 2003. 
 Herman Lima: História da Caricatura no Brasil: Vol. 3 (Brazilian caricature's history: 3rd Volume), José Olympio Editora publisher, Rio de Janeiro, 1963.
 Julieta Sobral: J. Carlos, designer, in Rafael Cardoso publisher. O design brasileiro antes do design: aspectos da história gráfica 1860-1960 (Brazilian design before Design: graphic's history facets), editora Cosac Naify, 2005.

External links
Biography at Lambiek's Comiclopedia (focuses on his comics work)
JotaCarlos.org

1884 births
1950 deaths
Brazilian cartoonists
Brazilian comics artists
Brazilian lyricists
Brazilian illustrators
Brazilian graphic designers
Brazilian sculptors
20th-century Brazilian dramatists and playwrights
People from Rio de Janeiro (city)
Brazilian male dramatists and playwrights
20th-century Brazilian male writers
Brazilian caricaturists